On July 17, 1999, death row inmate Frank Valdes (October 28, 1962 – July 17, 1999) was killed at Florida State Prison in Bradford County. That morning, nine correctional officers, carrying stun guns, entered his cell and beat him to death.

Background

Valdes had a death sentence resulting from the 1987 fatal shooting of Glades Correctional Institution Correctional Officer Fred Griffis. At the time, Valdes was attempting to assist an inmate escape. Fellow inmate William Van Poyck (July 4, 1954 – June 12, 2013) was sentenced to death for his role in Griffis' murder, and was executed on June 12, 2013.

After Valdes' death, prosecutors of the state criminal trial stated that the attack on him was due to a desire to prevent him from discussing mistreatment of inmates with reporters. The Florida Department of Corrections (FDC) stated that Valdes had threatened one of the officers, leading to an extraction team to be called to his cell.

Beating
The incident occurred in the X-Wing area of the prison. Inmates stated that the correctional officers placed the body in a hallway and used bleach to clean the Valdes cell; the inmates stated that the officers placed Valdes' body in another cell and then called 911. The autopsy showed prints of correctional officer boots in Valdes' skin, and he also had broken ribs. Valdes was pronounced dead at the Shands Hospital in Starke. That day, the Florida Department of Law Enforcement (FDLE) was notified about the incident.

It was alleged that Valdes committed suicide by diving off of his bunk and hitting the bars of the cell. The FDLE ruled that he died due to a beating. The nine officers, who were suspended from their jobs, refused to talk. This prompted the Federal Bureau of Investigation (FBI) to join the FDLE investigation.

Trial
Captain Timothy Alvin Thornton, Sergeant Charles Austin Brown, Sergeant Jason Patrick "J.P." Griffis, and Sergeant Robert William Sauls were indicted by an Alachua County, Florida grand jury on February 3, 2000. The charges were second degree murder, official corruption, battery on an inmate, and aggravated battery. The other five guards also had charges. One defendant was acquitted in 2000. In 2002, Thornton, Griffis, and Brown were acquitted. The jury giving the verdict consisted of five men and one woman. Bill Cervone, the Florida State Attorney, dropped the remaining charges in 2002. Cervone argued that the trial was problematic since it was in Bradford County, Florida, where other prisons are located, and he also cited the two previous acquittals.

Jason Griffis had no relation to Fred Griffis. Jason Griffis accused the trial of being politically motivated.

Aftermath
The Florida Department of Corrections fired all nine officers. Yolanda Murphy, the FDC spokesperson, stated that the nine had falsified reports and used excessive and/or unnecessary force and had, therefore, violated the Department's rules. Valdes' ex-wife and family brought civil suits. In 2002, officials from the United States Department of Justice (USDOJ) stated that they were considering bringing civil rights charges against the three officers.

As a result, the FDC added cameras in the X-Wing and began requiring the use of video cameras during cell extractions and planned use of force events.

See also

Death of Darren Rainey
Death of Marcia Powell
Death of Chavis Carter
Suicide of Rodney Hulin
Murder of Liam Ashley

References

External links
 "Message from the Secretary" (Archive). Florida Department of Corrections. May 10, 2002.
 Word, Ron. "Closing arguments set for Starke murder trial of correctional officers" (Archive). Associated Press at WTLV. February 15, 2002.

Criminal trials that ended in acquittal
Deaths by person in Florida
1999 in Florida
July 1999 events in the United States